Longistigma is a genus of giant aphids in the family Aphididae. There are at least three described species in Longistigma.

Species
These three species belong to the genus Longistigma:
 Longistigma caryae (Harris, T.W., 1841) c g b (giant bark aphid)
 Longistigma liquidambarus (Takahashi, R., 1925) c g
 Longistigma xizangensis Zhang, Guangxue, 1981 c g
Data sources: i = ITIS, c = Catalogue of Life, g = GBIF, b = Bugguide.net

References

Further reading

External links

 

Lachninae
Sternorrhyncha genera